The family name Meyer (also Meijer, Meier, Maier) stands for a dynasty of bronze casters of German origin, documented between the late 16th and the end of the 18th century, active in Copenhagen, Florence, Helsingør, Riga, Stockholm and Tallinn. They were predominantly cannon and bell casters and occasionally statue casters. Over generations they were casters to the City of Riga and to the King of Sweden mainly in Stockholm. Following the tradition of the journeyman years, members of this bronze-casting dynasty had to travel to complete their training before becoming Masters. Since the Middle Ages, bronze casters were highly skilled craftsmen who were very sought after and thus often travelled very long distances across Europe and beyond to where their technical expertise was sought. Courts typically competed to secure the services of the best casters.

A North-German origin of the Meyer family is most likely. Hans Meyer, member of the first known generation of this family, had relations to Lübeck, an important Hanseatic city with long tradition in metal casting. He himself wrote in Low-German, as is customary in Northern Germany. It is possible that he was related to another Hans Meyer, "by der Trave", who was the son-in-law of Lübeck's foremost caster Karsten Middeldorp (+1561). The misreading of a cannon's inscription led in the past to the false assumption that the Meyer family were of Nuremberg origin. The German origin is stated on the epitaph of the Swedish branch of the Meyer family in the Klara Church in Stockholm (“Origine Germano”), erected in 1761.

There are many pieces preserved cast by members of the Meyer family, documented or signed. Signatures have sometimes led to confusion since given names, as per common practice at the time, were repeatedly used in the family. Over six generations, seven Gerhardt (Gärdt, Gerdt, Gert, Gertts, Gerhard) and eight Johann (Hans) are known. Sometimes these have been mixed up in the literature.

The confusion is made more challenging as different members of the family used the same signature, often punched with the same set of punches, which were passed on over generations. 
As was customary for their profession, bronze casters of the Meyer family throughout all generations signed their casts using the traditional formula which let the piece itself speak: either in Latin "Me fecit…" (I was made by...) or German "mich goß…" (I was cast by...). On many casts made by members of the Meyer family the signature was made with punches. Over generations, casts dating from the late 16th to the mid-18th century were marked with the same set of punches. As was standard practise, they did note use the punches for marking bells. As some of these letter punches were gradually worn, single letters or numbers were replaced over time.

The two earliest known casters of this dynasty are Johann (I), who died 1610, and Gerhardt (I). The latter, coming from Stockholm, briefly joined Johann (I) in his workshop in Riga in 1596 before moving on to Italy. It is not certain how they were related.

State of research 
Most of the literature dealing with history and oeuvre of the Meyer family has a local context. Their activity in Riga was part of a vast research by the Latvian architect Paul Campe (1885-1960) who first published his results in a comprehensive publication in 1930. His unpublished material about the subject is preserved in Marburg (DSHI). He also contributed the basic articles in Thieme-Becker. Information about the family members active in Stockholm is given in Nordisk Familjebook 1904–26, Vol. XIII, 1290, Svenska Konstnärer o.J. (1955), 257, and Svenskt Konstnärslexikon o.J. [1961] , Vol. IV, 118. In these contributions the connections between the branches of the family active in various places have not been sufficiently understood. Extensive research of the related archival material mainly in Latvia and Sweden has recently increased the basic knowledge about the Meyer family. The chronology is based on a family tree covering the time from 1582 to 1797 published by A. Rudigier and B. Truyols in 2019.

Family workshops and their masters

Riga

Johann (I) 
Johann (I), also called Hans, died in 1610. He must have spent time, possibly part of his journeyman years, in Lübeck. This can be derived from a dispute he had with the guild in Lübeck, when he was already in Riga. The guild accused him of having poached assistants from his colleagues there. He seems to have been for some time in military service as in the abovementioned dispute his first wife was pejoratively referred to as a soldiers’ moll (öffentliche Haerhure). The high-tech knowledge and skill of cannon-casters was constantly needed in the army. After years of travel in military service Hans Meyer came to Riga, at the time a German-speaking town, to become assistant to the caster to the City Michel Baier. Before 1582 he took over Baier's workshop and was appointed his successor in 1585. Meyer was in permanent scuffle with the Riga guild and became a member only in 1594. The inscription on a bell he made for St. Peter's church in 1585 is a testimony of this difficult circumstances: "In Gottes Namen hat mich Hans Meyer gegossen, das hat manigen verdrose" (In the Name of God Hans Meyer cast me, which did annoy some people). Hans died in 1610. He left behind his second wife Catarina Bordinck and at least three underage children. Catarina continued to run the workshop until around 1612 when it was taken over by Medardus Gessus (Gesus, Gisus) from Constance whom she possibly married. Hans Meyer is said to have been the best caster ever active in Latvia. Some of his cannons (called “Buchse” in 16th century German) are still preserved.

Georg 
Georg, also called Jürgen or Gorgen, died in 1657. He was son of Johann (I) and may have learned in 1610, still underaged, under his father's successor, the itinerant caster Medardus Gessus. Georg himself became caster to the City of Riga in 1627 after master Medardus, possibly his stepfather, had left Riga for Stockholm in 1623. Four years later, in 1631, he was awarded citizenship. He died before November 23, 1657, and left behind a wife Anna Bruens (died after 1663) and a son named Johann, whose profession is unknown.

Gerhardt (III) 
Gerhardt (III) lived from 1644 until 1701. As the son of Gerhardt (II) and Georg's nephew, he was born in Stockholm in 1644. Joining his father's and his uncle's business, he was active first in Tallinn and then in Riga where he was appointed caster to the City in 1671, a position that he held until his death. In 1677 he was awarded citizenship of Riga but remained a lifelong member of the Stockholm guild, which at times caused conflicts given his public position. Gerhardt (III) succeeded in casting bells and cannons.  The number of 36 ordnances and 35 church bells preserved, testify his vast production. With his death in 1701 the activity of the Meyer family in Riga seems to have ended. Nothing is known about his son Gerhardt (V), born in 1682.

Helsingör - Copenhagen

Johann (II) 
Johann (II) died in 1669. He was son of Johann (I)) and, like his siblings, underage in 1610, the year of his father's death. He must have received part of his formation like his brothers Georg and Gerhardt from Medardus Gessus. In 1637 he was appointed head of the Royal Danish foundry in Helsingör with the salary paid out of the Öresund toll. In 1640 he took over this foundry and became independent, losing the privilege of casting cannons which was restricted to foundries which were under direct control of the state. Over 20 church bells cast by him are known today. One of his bells, made for Kronborg Castle, was the biggest bell cast in Denmark until then. In 1655 he was appointed head of the Royal foundry in Copenhagen, with casting guns as his primarily occupation. At this time cannon production in three important places of the Baltic, Copenhagen, Riga and Stockholm, were in the hands of the three sons of Johann (I) Meyer. The difficult economic situation due to King Christian IV's unsuccessful military enterprises brought loss of production in the years 1657–60. Johann (II) held his position until his death in 1669. Among the children he had with his Danish wife Sophia was Hans (Johann) born in 1645. His godfather was Claus van Damm of a Hamburg-based family of casters and Johann (I)’s predecessor as head of the Copenhagen foundry.

Stockholm

Gerhardt (I) 
The first member of the Meyer family linked with the Swedish capital is Gerhardt (I): "Me fecit Gerhardt Meyer Holmiae" – Holmia is the Latin name for Stockholm – is the caster's signature on a bronze sculpture of a Bathing Venus (1597). In the years 1592-1595 a Gärt (Gerhardt) Meyer is documented in Stockholm. He seems to have left the Swedish capital in 1596 by moving to Riga, where he was briefly active in Hans Meyer's workshop. Hans and Gerhardt must have been close relatives. Under Hans Meyer as head of the foundry, Gerhardt must have cast the monumental candelabrum for St. Peter's church. The next year he appears in Florence where he cast the Bathing Venus for Giambologna, court sculptor of the Medici. In Florence he appears to have joined the German speaking community, which gathered in the Compagnia di Santa Barbara, a religious brotherhood. In their documents a "Gherardo fiammingho" is mentioned shortly after the cast of the Venus. Thanks to the reuse of his set of punches by later generations of his family one can assume that Gerhardt (I) returned to Sweden at some point. He could be identical with a homonymous goldsmith (Giert Meyer), active in Stockholm between 1626 and 1631. This goldsmith Meyer was a protégé of Erich Larsson von der Linde, future father-in-law of Gerhardt (II). At the time it was not unusual for trained goldsmiths to be active in the challenging bronze-casting of monumental figures: Benvenuto Cellini and Balthazar Keller are two famous examples.

Gerhardt (II) 
Gerhard (II), also known as Gert, died in 1655. A permanent activity in Stockholm started with him, a son of Johann (I). Born in Riga and at his father's death in 1610 still underaged, he got his formation by his master (and possibly stepfather) Medardus Gessus. In 1621 Riga was conquered by the Swedes and in 1623 Gessus was appointed head of the Royal cannon foundry in the Swedish capital. Gerhardt is mentioned amongst Gessus’ assistants in the same year. He later became the leading bronze caster to the Swedish Crown. The challenging industry of bronze cannons (in 17th century Swedish called "Stycke") was one of the key military tasks at the time. Meyer established well in his new homeland, in 1635 he married Maria von der Linde, daughter of Erich Larsson von der Linde, one of the richest merchants in town. Gerhardt (II) owned a house in the city and had his own seat in the German Church, Stockholm St. Gertrud's. He made proposals to Queen Christina to improve the founding industry. In 1641 he was appointed head of the Royal foundry by the Queen. On this occasion the old foundry in Brunkeberg near St. Klara church was rebuilt in order to provide the master with a modern workshop. Unlike his predecessors as founders of the King of Sweden, Gerhardt owned the foundry. Besides cannon-casting, bell-casting was an important source of income, particularly in times when there was little need for artillery. The king passed a decree to allow his cannon casters to cast bells. In 1655 Meyer was granted the permission to cast not only for the Crown but also for important aristocrats. He was rich enough to rebuild the foundry at his own expense after it was destroyed by fire. In 1647 he executed the bronze cast of a man wielding a whip for the pillory on Stortorget square, the so-called "Kopparmatte" after a model by the German “bilthacker” (wood sculptor) Jost Henne or Martin Redtmer. This was the first bronze statue ever cast in Sweden; today it is in the collection of the Stockholm Stadtsmuseet. Gerhardt (II) died in 1655. His wife Maria got permission to carry on with the workshop.

Johann (IV) 
Johann (IV) lived ca. 1636–1679. As a son of Gerhardt (II) he was born circa 1636. He received his privilege as caster to the crown in 1655, the year of his father's death. In 1658 he became liveryman of the Stockholm guild and from 1666 he was head of the Royal foundry. He is said to have been active as gun and bell caster in Sweden as well as in Finland, where seven of his bells are known. Only few of his cannons are preserved, all made between 1665 and 1677. As was already granted to his father, Johann was also permitted to work for Swedish aristocrats like Magnus de la Gardie. After his death in 1679 the workshop was continued by his widow Maria Köpke, who then ran the business together with her second husband Michael Bader from Vilnius.

Gerhardt (IV) 
Gerhardt (IV) lived from 1667 until 1710. As a son of Johann (IV) he was born in 1667. He got his formation in his father's and in his stepfather's workshop before travelling as a journeyman to Germany to continue his training. Business had become tough by then. Whereas Gerhardt's ancestors and predecessors in charge of the Royal foundry had their major commissions due to the modernisation of Swedish artillery, it seems that the implementation of modern cannon types had been mostly completed at the time. Furthermore, there was in Sweden a notorious lack of copper since the 1640s, severely restricting the production of cannons. Yet, the king's ambitious plans for the embellishment of the new residence opened new fields of activity. Since 1693 there were ongoing construction works for a new Royal Stockholm Palace after the plans by Nicodemus Tessin the Younger. For that purpose, a whole team of French artists and artisans came over the following years to Stockholm, including the French caster Jean Hubeault who made ornamental casts for the decoration of the palace. It was planned to decorate the new palace with monumental bronze sculptures. Casting bronze sculptures was a task so far unknown in Sweden. The only exception had been the above-mentioned Kopparmatte, which from a technical point of view is merely a rather rudimentary achievement.
 
In January 1693 Meyer asked the king for permission and support to travel to France in order to improve his skills and to learn the French practises in figure-casting. The request was granted to him and in July 1693 he left Stockholm for an apprenticeship at Jean-Balthazar Keller (1638-1702), who at the time was caster to Louis XIV in Paris. Only two months later, in September 1693, Gerhardt's stepfather Michael Bader died, which would have required his return to Stockholm. As the Swedish king guaranteed that the foundry would remain in the family's hands, Meyer delayed his return to Stockholm until July 1694. Keller was displeased with Meyer who not only wanted to leave his master before but also tried to take two of his assistants with him to Sweden.
 
In 1695, back in Sweden, he became liveryman of the Stockholm guild, head of the Royal foundry and married in the very same year Catharina Kammecker. Soon after Meyer wrote to the king offering to cast "large metal statues and other decorations" as well as iron "stoves", works which Meyer pretended to be able to execute thanks to his French experiences. He requested to the Royal artillery department (Krigskollegium) permission to be also allowed to cast portrait busts, statues and other kind of works in order to secure the financial success of his workshop.
 
Nicodemus Tessin distrusted Meyer and investigated with Keller in Paris about his former apprentice and his capacities in figure-casting. Keller reported that Meyer – during his relatively short stay – only attended the final steps of the cast of an equestrian statuette and that he lacked knowledge about the decisive preparatory steps in casting such as making the core investment, building armature or melting the wax. In comparison to the cast of a statuette the cast of a monumental bronze sculpture is by far more challenging. In the words of the Swedish envoy in Paris, Daniel Cronström, Meyer would not be capable of carrying out a large-size figure cast (“grande ouvrage”) without help. As a result of this enquiries, the French caster François Aubry was hired from Paris to cast the sculptures for the Royal palace. He arrived in Stockholm in May 1697. There is no evidence that Gerhardt (IV) did ever cast a figure.

There has been an attempt to attribute the cast of Giambologna's Bathing Venus of 1597 to Gerhardt (IV). However, the date 1597 on the Venus is paleographically undoubtable. Nonetheless, it has been argued, that the 5 in the date of Gerhardt I's signature would originally have been, on the casting model, a 6 which did transform itself during the casting process accidentally into a 5. Therefore, the date should be interpreted as 1697 enabling the attribution of the cast to Gerhardt (IV). This assumption has been disproved on technical grounds and is contradicted by natural scientific evidence, which excludes a casting date after 1648 with a probability of 99.75%.
 
Today some cannons and a large number of church bells cast by Gerhardt (IV) are preserved. He and three of his children died in the plague of 1710. His widow ran the business after her husband's untimely death.

Gerhardt (VI) 
Gerhardt (VI) lived from 1704 until 1784. As a son of Gerhardt (IV) he was in 1720, ten years after his father's death, at the age of sixteen already appointed Royal cannon caster by King Frederic I. He moved to Uppsala and in 1724 he started a three-year journey through Europe, where he was an apprentice in foundries in Germany (possibly in Nuremberg), Switzerland, France, The Netherlands and England. After his return to Stockholm he became head of the Royal foundry in 1728, following his father and his grandfather. His main business must have been bell-casting, as in Finland alone 47 bells of his hand are preserved. Besides, he made bronze casts after models of the leading French artists of the time: busts of the Swedish Kings Charles XII (1747/48) and Adolf Frederick (1749/51) after Jacques-Philippe Bouchardon as well as puttoes and ornamental shields for the staircase of the Royal Palace. He cast the monuments of King Gustav Wasa in 1770 (Stockholm, Riddarhus Square) after a model by Pierre Hubert L'Archevêque and in 1779 the equestrian monument of King Gustav Adolf (Stockholm, Gustav Adolfs square), after models by L'Archevêque and Johan Tobias Sergel. The latter was the first equestrian monument made in Sweden. He also cast in lead the medallions and trophies of the West- and South façade of the Royal Castle, and, in Riddarholmen Church, the pulpit and parts of the decorations of the Royal Burial Chapel. 
He was innovative in techniques of casting guns and in developing fire hoses. He opened further workshops in Akers and Stafsjö. In 1756 Gerhardt (VI) sold the family foundry to the crown by remaining its director until his retirement in 1772. He became member of the Royal Academy of Science and was raised to the peerage in 1775.

Gerhardt (VII) 
Gerhardt (VII) lived from 1728 until 1797; he was a son of Gerhardt (VI). In 1772 he followed his father in the position of a Royal cannon caster, but also bells made by him are known. In 1794 the crown ordered the closing of the foundry because of their outdated equipment, and its relocation to Marieberg. With Gerhardt's death in 1797, over six generations and more than 200 years of activity of the Meyer dynasty of bronze casters ended.

Selection of bells, cannons and other objects cast by members of the Meyer family

References

Archives and Bibliography 
J.C. Brotze = Johann Christoph, Livonica. Sammlung verschiedener Liefländischer Monumente, Prospecte, Müntzen, Wapen I-X, Manuscript, Latvijas Universitātes Akadēmiskā bibliotēka, Riga.

DSHI 100 Campe 28,1 = Bequest Paul Campe (1885-1960), Herder Institute for Historical Research on East Central Europe, Marburg

KA = Krigsarkivet, Stockholm

LVVA = Latvijas Valsts vēstures arhīvs, Riga

RA = Riksarkivet, Stockholm

SSA = Stockholm Stadsarkiv

A.A.: "Der Pulver-Thurm", Rigaische Stadt-Blätter XXVIII, 51 (1827), pp. 414–416.

A.A.: "Die Kirche des heil. Olai in Reval", Das Inland. Eine Wochenschrift für Liv-, Est- und Kurland's Geschichte, Geographie, Statistik und Literatur I, 27 (1836), pp. 450–457.

A.A.: "Beitrag zu der Kunde der Alterthümer unserer Stadt", Rigaische Stadt-Blätter XXXIX, 23 (1838a), pp. 177–180.

A.A.: "Beitrag zu der Kunde der Alterthümer unserer Stadt", Rigaische Stadt-Blätter XXXIX, 24 (1838b), pp. 186–191.

A. Anteins: Bronza Latvijā. Pa metālu ieguves un apstrādes vēstures lappusēm, Riga 1988.

P. Arends: Die St. Petri-Kirche in Riga, Riga 1944.

T.A.J. Arne: Det stora Svitjod: essayer om gångna tiders Svensk-ryska kulturförbindelser, Stockholm 1917.

W. Baum: "Altrigasche Geschütze", Rigasche Zeitung Nr. 250 (1910), p. 1.

N.E. Brandenburg: Istoricheskīĭ katalog S.-Peterburgskago artillerīĭskago muzei︠a︡ III., Sankt Petersburg 1889.

J.K. Broce: Zīmējumi un apraksti 2. Rīgas priekšpilsētas un tuvākā apkārtne [Die Vorstädte und die Umgebung Rigas], Zeids, Teodors (cur.), Riga 1996.

J. Böttiger: Das königliche Schloß zu Stockholm. Amtlicher Führer, Malmö 1911.

F. Brunstermann: Die Geschichte der Kleinen oder St. Johannis-Gilde in Wort und Bild, Riga 1902.

P. Campe: Die Kirchenglocken Lettlands von ältester Zeit an bis zum Jahre 1860 und ihre Gießer, Riga 1930 (Acta Universitatis Latviensis. Architekturas Fakultates Serija, I.1.).

P. Campe: "Das Stadtgießhaus zu Riga", Baltischer Almanach  (1931), pp. 110–120.

C.M. Cipolla: Segel und Kanonen. Die europäische Expansion zur See, Berlin 1999.

P.C. Claussen: "Früher Künstlerstolz. Mittelalterliche Signaturen als Quelle der Kunstsoziologie", in: Bauwerk und Bildwerk im Hochmittelalter. Anschauliche Beiträge zur Kultur- und Sozialgeschichte, Clausberg, Karl et al. (ed.), Giessen 1981, pp. 7–34 (Kunstwissenschaftliche Untersuchungen des Ulmer Vereins, Verband für Kunst- und Kulturwissenschaften, XI).

D. Diemer, L. Hinners: "Gerhardt Meyer made me in Stockholm": a bronze "Bathing Woman" after Giambologna", The Burlington Magazine 160 (2018), pp. 545–553.

J. Döring: "Die St. Trinitatis Kirche in Mitau", Sitzungsberichte der kurländischen Gesellschaft für Literatur und Kunst (1868), pp. 218–244.

H-G. Eichler: Handbuch der Stück- und Glockengießer auf der Grundlage der im mittleren und östlichen Deutschland überlieferten Glocken. Eingerichtet von Barbara Poettgen, Greifenstein 2003 (Schriften aus dem Deutschen Glockenmuseum, II).

G. Elgenstierna: Den introducerade svenska adelns ättartavlor, 9 vols., Stockholm 1925–36.

Gesellschaft für Geschichte und Altertumskunde der Ostseeprovinzen Rußlands in Riga (ed.): Führer durch die Sammlungen der Gesellschaft im Dommuseum, Riga 1911.

H. Fett: Norges kirker i det 16de og 17de aarhundrede, Kristiania 1911 (Gammel norsk kultur i tekst og billeder).

E. Gribsø: "Frederiksborg Amts Kirkeklokker", Frederiksborg Amts Historiske Samfund (ed.), Hillerød 1934, pp. 57–118.

M. Grieb, ed.: Nürnberger Künstlerlexikon. Bildende Künstler, Kunsthandwerker, Gelehrte, Sammler, Kulturschaffende und Mäzene vom 12. bis zur Mitte des 20. Jahrhunderts, 4 vols., München 2007.

T. Hach: "Mittheilungen über Rigasche Erzgießer", Rigasche Stadtblätter 75, p. 29 (1884).

T. Hach: Lübecker Glockenkunde, Lübeck 1913 (Veröffentlichungen zur Geschichte der freien und Hansestadt Lübeck, II).

L. Hammarskiöld: "Kopparkanoner I Sverige och deras tillverkning", Med hammare och fackla. Årsbok utgiven av Sancte Örjens Gille XVIII (1949/50), pp. 25–64.

J. Hedberg: Kungl. Artilleriet. Carl X Gustafs tid, Kristianstad 1982.

L. Hinners: De fransöske handtwerkarne vid Stockholms slott 1693–1713. Yrkesroller, organisation, arbetsprocesser, Stockholm 2012 (Eidos. Skrifter från Konstvetenskapliga institutionen vid Stockholms universitet, XXV).

L. Hvass, T. Bill-Jessen: Christian 4. som kanonstøber : kongens værksteder ved Kronborg - Gethuset, Hammermøllen og Kobbermøllen, Helsingør Kommunes Museer 2011.

G. Jensch: "Der Handel Rigas im 17. Jahrhundert. Ein Beitrag zur livländischen Wirtschaftsgeschichte in schwedischer Zeit", Mitteilungen aus der livländischen Geschichte XXIV, 2 (1930), pp. 49–146.

A.N. Kennard: Gunfounding and Gunfounders. A Directory of Cannon Founders from Earliest Times to 1850, London-New York-Sydney 1986.

K.M. Kowalski: "Die Glocken aus den Gießereien des Ostseeraumes in Riga und Lettland (im Lichte der Sammlung von Paul Campe)", in: Riga und der Ostseeraum. Von der Gründung 1201 bis in die Frühe Neuzeit, Misāns, Ilgvars and Horst Wernicke (ed.), Marburg 2005, pp. 463–486 (Tagungen zur Ostmitteleuropa-Forschung, XXII).

J.A.A. Lüdeke: Denkmal der Wieder-Eröffnung der Deutschen Kirche in Stockholm zur öffentlichen Gottes-Verehrung nach volendeter Ausbesserung 1821. Eine Predikt mit diplomatisch-historischen Beylagen, Stockholm 1823.

A. Magnien: "Les bronzes "Keller"", Bulletin de la société de l'histoire de l'art français 1996 (1997), pp. 37-63.

C. Mettig, Constantin, F. Moll: Illustrirter Führer durch Riga und Umgebung, Riga 1892.

L.W. Munthe: Kongl. fortifikationens historia, 6 vols., Norstedt 1902.

Nordisk Familjebok. Konversationslexikon och Realencyklopedi, 38 vols., Stockholm 1904-26.

R. Pitkäranta: Suomen kirkkojen latina. Piirtokirjoitukset kirkoissa, kellotapuleissa ja hautausmailla. (EFIL Ecclesiarum Finlandiae Inscriptiones Latinae), Helsinki 2004 (Suomen kirkkohistoriallisen seuran toimituksia, CXCIII).

E. Ploss: "Der Inschriftentypus "N. N. me fecit" und seine geschichtliche Entwicklung bis ins Mittelalter", Zeitschrift für deutsche Philologie LXXVII (1958), pp. 25–46.

H.W.J. Rickers: Etwas über die St. Olai-Kirche in Reval, die durch einen Blitzstrahl in der Nacht vom 15. zum 16. Juny 1820 zerstört wurde, Reval 1820.

C.F. Rothlieb: Beskrifning öfver Kongl. Riddarholmskyrkan, Stockholm 1822.

A. Rudigier, B. Truyols: "Jean Bologne et les jardins d' Henri IV [avec un' avant-propos par Bertrand Jestaz]", Bulletin monumental 174, 3 (2016), pp. 247–373.

A. Rudigier: ""Letter to the editor" [Response to Diemer, Dorothea/Hinners, Linda, ""Gerhardt Meyer made me in Stockholm": a bronze "Bathing Woman" after Giambologna", in: The Burlington Magazine 160 (2018), pp. 545–553]», The Burlington Magazine 160 (2018), pp. 813-815.

A. Rudigier, B. Truyols: "Giambologna. Court Sculptor to Ferdinando I. His Art, his Style and the Medici Gifts to Henry IV." Photography by Georg Steinmetzer, London 2019.

F. Siewert: Geschichte und Urkunden der Rigafahrer in Lübeck, Berlin 1897 (Hansische Geschichtsquellen, I).

Stockholms Kyrkor VI. S. Klara Kyrka, o.O. 1928 (Sveriges Kyrkor).

Svenka Konstnärer. Biografisk Handbok, Malmö o.J. (1955).

H. Hofberg et al.: Svenskt Biografiskt Handlexikon, 2 vols., Stockholm 1906.

Svenskt konstnärslesikon, Malmö o.J. [1961].

R-A. Weigert, C. Hernmarck, eds.: Les relations artistiques entre la France et la Suède 1693-1718. Nicodemus Tessin le jeune et Daniel Cronström Correspondance (extraits), Stockholm 1964.

M. Thiel: "Das Arsenal in der Citadelle von Riga", Rigaische Stadt-Blätter XVIII, 49-50 (1827), p. 397; pp. 405–407.

U. Thieme, F. Becker, eds.: Allgemeines Lexikon der bildenden Künstler von der Antike bis zur Gegenwart, 37 vols., Leipzig 1907–50.

S. Thurm: Deutscher Glockenatlas II. Bayerisch-Schwaben, Grundmann, Günther (ed.), Berlin 1967.

German families
Swedish families